El Refugio (de los Sueños) (The Refuge (of the Dreams)) is a 2006 Argentine television series, filmed in Buenos Aires. It was directed by Celina Amadeo, and starred Piru Sáez, Francisco Bass, Jorge Maggio, Belén Scalella and María Fernanda Neil, who formed a band named Rolabogan and recorded a soundtrack album.

Cast

Music

References

External links 
 

2006 telenovelas
2006 Argentine television series debuts
2006 Argentine television series endings
Argentine telenovelas
Spanish-language telenovelas
El Trece telenovelas